Bluebird Automotive was a British manufacturer of milk floats and other electric service vehicles. The company existed from 2001 to 2007, and produced a few futuristic prototypes, but no production runs of vehicles. The Electron E150 prototype held the world land speed record for an electric milk float.

Company history
Bluebird Automotive began life as a company called Redi-51 Limited, based in South Wales, which was incorporated on 12 March 2001. It went through a series of name changes, becoming Bluebird Automotive Industries on 5 April 2001, Bluebird Automotive Group on 20 November 2001 and finally Bluebird Automotive on 5 November 2002. In 2007 a meeting of creditors decided that the company was no longer solvent, and that it should be voluntarily wound up. Liquidators were appointed on 1 March 2007, and the company was finally dissolved on 13 July 2010.

Between these two endpoints, precise details of what occurred are not always clear, but some of the details have been preserved in a trade mark dispute document. Golden Vale Dairies in Bridgend were facing a crisis in the early 2000s, with a fleet of ageing electric vehicles used for doorstep milk delivery, but no manufacturers still making new vehicles of this type. They approached Richard Rees, a director of Bluebird Automotive, and Paul Sparrow of Amalfi Designs was engaged to undertake some of the design work for Rees. In July 2002, sufficient progress had been made that a proposal was presented to Golden Vale Daries, as a result of which two vehicles were delivered to Golden Vale at an unspecified date. In parallel with this, Bluebird built a vehicle to challenge the world speed record for milk floats, which they did in August 2003. The chassis for the record-breaking vehicle, known as an Electron E150, was Llandaff Engineering.

At some point, it was decided that a joint company should be set up, to handle manufacture of the vehicles, as Bluebird did not have the resources to do so, and needed the co-operation of a company like Llandaff. The company, Q Electric Vehicles Ltd, was set up on 6 July 2004. The intention was that Llandaff would supply funding and engineering services to the project, and Bluebird would supply intellectual property rights and technical services. The lack of a proper formal agreement between the two parties led to a trade mark dispute over the use of QEV as the brand name for vehicles and Q Electric Vehicles as a company name. It appears that an order for five vehicles was placed by Golden Vale Dairies in November 2004. By the time the trade mark dispute was judged, Bluebird was already in the hands of liquidators. Subsequently, Q Electric Vehicles was wound up by order of the court, as it was insolvent, and the company was dissolved on 15 January 2013.

Vehicles 
The company intended to market vehicles with a generic QEV designation. The QEV70 was the smallest, suitable for a payload of between 1.5 and 2.2 tonnes, depending on body and battery weight. The empty weight was 2.18 tonnes, the maximum weight was 3.82 tonnes and the maximum speed was  The range with one battery charge was 40 to 100 miles (64 to 160 km), depending on the chosen battery variant. To allow continuous operation, the batteries could be changed relatively easily. The 73 volt motor delivered a maximum of 11.9 kW.

Depending on the specification, it would weigh between 7.5 and 10 tonnes.

In response to an enquiry from Express Dairies, the company also developed a milk float which they called the XDV. It appears that at least one of these was actually supplied to the customer, as it was placed on trial in Northampton, where it was used to deliver parcels for Parcelforce.

Records 

In 2003, the company were challenged to take part in a land speed record for electric milk floats by a team from Electric Dreams, based in the Midlands. The chassis for the vehicle was designed by Llandaff Engineering, with bodywork by Amalfi Designs.

See also 
 Milk float

Bibliography

References

External links 
 

Electric vehicle manufacturers of the United Kingdom